Poecilomigas elegans is a species of spiders in the family Migidae. It is found in South Africa.

References

External links 
 Poecilomigas elegans at the World Spider Catalog

Endemic fauna of South Africa
Migidae
Spiders described in 1987
Spiders of South Africa